The Aan River is a short river in the South Island of New Zealand.

The river flows out of Lake Innes and into the sea on the southern coast of the South Island.
The river may be reached on foot via the South Coast Track, which crosses it via a suspension bridge.

References

Rivers of Fiordland
Foveaux Strait
Rivers of New Zealand